Wanstead Park is a railway station in Forest Gate, London. It is operated by London Overground. Despite its name, Wanstead Park Station is not situated in Wanstead but in Forest Gate – and it is not near Wanstead Park but Wanstead Flats. The station was opened 9 July 1894.

History 

The line was electrified in 2016-7 – whilst the working was underway (from 6 June 2016 until February 2017), trains were replaced by buses between Barking & South Tottenham (until 23 September 2016) and then through to Gospel Oak thereafter.

Services
Predominantly during weekdays there is a quarter-hourly service of trains to the station (4tph each way). The line and rail tracks are also used for freight trains passing through.

Connections
London Buses routes 58, 308 and 330 serve the station.

References

External links

Railway stations in the London Borough of Newham
DfT Category E stations
Former Tottenham and Forest Gate Railway stations
Railway stations in Great Britain opened in 1894
Railway stations served by London Overground